Adelbert Range is a mountain range in Madang Province, north-central Papua New Guinea.

The Northern Adelbert languages and Southern Adelbert languages are spoken in the region.

Fauna and flora
As with other mountain ranges in Papua New Guinea, it is cloaked in rainforest, and is home to many rare species of fauna and flora and is highly biodiverse. Adelbert Range is home to many species of birds, including bird-of-paradise and the endemic Fire-maned Bowerbird.

References 
 

Mountain ranges of Papua New Guinea
Madang Province